Arthur C. Becker (born January 12, 1942) is an American retired professional basketball player born in Akron, Ohio.

A  forward from Arizona State University, Becker played six seasons (1967–1973) in the American Basketball Association (ABA) as a member of the Houston Mavericks, Indiana Pacers, Denver Rockets, Dallas Chaparrals, and New York Nets. He averaged 12.5 points per game over the course of his career and appeared in two ABA All-Star Games.

Since 2005, Becker has served as president of the National Junior College Athletic Association (NJCAA). He served two stints (1974–1981; 1993–1996) as men's head basketball coach at Scottsdale Community College and coached men's tennis at Scottsdale from 1981 to 1983.

References

Sources

NJCAA profile

1942 births
Living people
American men's basketball coaches
American men's basketball players
American tennis coaches
Arizona State Sun Devils men's basketball players
Basketball coaches from Ohio
Basketball players from Akron, Ohio
Dallas Chaparrals players
Denver Rockets players
Houston Mavericks players
Indiana Pacers players
Junior college men's basketball coaches in the United States
New York Nets players
St. Louis Hawks draft picks
Forwards (basketball)